Lena Dürr (born 4 August 1991) is a German World Cup alpine ski racer and specializes in slalom.

Career 
Born in Munich, and raised in nearby Germering, Dürr made her World Cup debut in February 2008. She has two World Cup wins; the first was also her first podium, a parallel slalom in 2013. It was a City Event race in Moscow, Russia, on 29 January, where she came as a reserve. Her second win came exactly a decade later in a slalom at Špindlerův Mlýn, Czech Republic, where she edged out runner-up Mikaela Shiffrin. The two had switched positions on the podium in a slalom the previous day. Dürr won the bronze medal in slalom at the 2023 World Championships.

Personal life 
Both her sister Katharina Dürr and father Peter Dürr are/were alpine ski racers.

World Cup results

Season standings

Race podiums
 2 wins – (1 SL, 1 CE)
 9 podiums – (8 SL, 1 CE); 37 top tens

World Championship results

Olympic results

References

External links

1991 births
Living people
Skiers from Munich
German female alpine skiers
Olympic alpine skiers of Germany
Alpine skiers at the 2018 Winter Olympics
Alpine skiers at the 2022 Winter Olympics
Medalists at the 2022 Winter Olympics
Olympic medalists in alpine skiing
Olympic silver medalists for Germany